Springfield is an unincorporated community in Bingham County, Idaho, United States. Springfield has a post office with ZIP code 83277.

References

Unincorporated communities in Bingham County, Idaho
Unincorporated communities in Idaho